Maple taffy (sometimes maple toffee in English-speaking Canada, tire d'érable or tire sur la neige in French-speaking Canada; also sugar on snow or candy on the snow or leather aprons in the United States) is a sugar candy made by boiling maple sap past the point where it would form maple syrup, but not so long that it becomes maple butter or maple sugar. It is part of traditional culture in Quebec, Eastern Ontario, New Brunswick and northern New England. In these regions, it is poured onto the snow, then lifted either with a small wooden stick, such as a popsicle stick, or a metal dinner fork.

Method
The candy is made by boiling maple syrup to about 112 °C (234 °F). It is best to use a candy thermometer. The thick liquid may be kept hot over a very low flame or in a pan of hot water, but should not be stirred as it will form grainy crystals. This liquid is then poured in a molten state upon clean snow, whereupon the cold causes it to rapidly thicken. If the syrup runs, rather than hardens, when it is poured on the snow, then it has not yet been boiled long enough to make the soft maple candy. Once sufficiently hardened, the candy can be picked up and eaten. The higher a temperature one boils the initial syrup, the thicker the final result will be. As it is popularly eaten soft, it is usually served fresh. It is most often prepared and eaten alongside the making of maple syrup at a sugar shack, or cabane à sucre.

Regions

The practice in Quebec is conducted in a "cabane à sucre" (literally, "sugar cabin," the rustic, outdoor structure where maple sap is boiled down to syrup and sugar) and the taffy is served with traditional Québécois dishes, including many savory ones that feature maple sugar as a glaze or flavoring element. In New England, the practice is sometimes called a sugar on snow party, and the soft candy is traditionally served with donuts, sour dill pickles, and coffee. The pickles and coffee serve to counter the intense sweetness of the candy. 

Maple taffy is also made in the Canadian province of Manitoba using syrup from the Manitoba maple tree (also known as a box elder). The syrup and taffy produced from a Manitoba maple are generally darker and have a mustier flavour than that made from sugar maples.

In popular culture 
NHL hockey player Yanni Gourde ate maple taffy on snow out of the bowl of the Stanley Cup in his hometown of Saint-Narcisse-de-Beaurivage, Quebec, following the Tampa Bay Lightning's 2021 Stanley Cup championship win against the Montreal Canadiens, two days after his teammate and fellow Quebecer Mathieu Joseph ate poutine out of the Cup in Chambly, Quebec.

See also
 List of foods made from maple
 Cuisine of Quebec
 Canadian cuisine

References

External links

 Maple candy
 Video of how to make maple taffy

Canadian confectionery
Canadian cuisine
Cuisine of Quebec
Taffy
New England cuisine
Sugar confectionery
Vermont cuisine
Vermont culture